The Fuji Xerox Minerva are an American football team located in Ebina, Kanagawa, Japan. After four years in the X2 league, the team was promoted to the X-League X2 division for 2017.

Seasons

References

External links 
  (Japanese)

American football in Japan
Fuji Xerox
1975 establishments in Japan
American football teams established in 1975
X-League teams